The Kreuzfelsen is a mountain in the Upper Palatine Forest in Germany, near the border with the Czech Republic. The Kreuzfelsen is located at the southern end of the Upper Palatine Forest, between the cities of Furth im Wald and Waldmünchen.

References 

Central Uplands
Mountains of Germany